Poison Clan was a Southern hip-hop group signed to Luke Records from 1990 to 1995, the group had various line-ups and members were JT Money, Debonaire, Drugz, Uzi, Madball and Big Ram.

Discography

Albums

Studio albums

Compilations

Singles

American hip hop groups
Southern hip hop groups
Musical groups from Miami
Gangsta rap groups